Casti can refer to:
Casti connubii, a papal encyclical.
Giovanni Battista Casti, an Italian poet.
Casti-Wergenstein, a Swiss municipality composed of Casti and Wergenstein
John Casti, an author, mathematician, and entrepreneur

See also
Kasti (disambiguation)
Gasti, village in Iran